In the early days of MTV, the first and most popular music television network in the U.S., many of the more successful musicians featured on the channel could be seen doing station identification spots for the network, exclaiming the signature line, I want my MTV!, and other phrases. Over the years, MTV would gather a large list of slogans that would become embedded in popular culture.

MTV slogans in the U.S.
 "You'll never look at music the same way again" (The first slogan; appeared on the original blue MTV shirt.)
 "I want my MTV!" (Originally intended as a promotional tool encouraging subscribers to ask their cable providers to add the MTV network; later became the iconic slogan for MTV for more than a decade, even being featured in the Dire Straits song Money for Nothing)
 "Too much is never enough"
 "Turn it on, leave it on"
 "See the music you want to see"
 "Army MTV" (Tina Cousins's lyrical spoofs from ABC's America's Watching and visuals spoofs from NBC's Let's All Be There)
 "We're Music, We're MTV"
 "The music revolution will be televised"
 "MTV... Proud as a Moon Man" ("Weird Al" Yankovic's spoof of NBC's 1979-1981 slogan Proud as a Peacock)
 "Doodle Doodle Dee, Wubba Wubba Wubba"
 "MTV Lives In Your Music"
 "Some People Just Don't Get It"
 "Watch and Learn"
 "M-m-m-m T-t-t-t V-v-v-v"
 "MTV News: You Hear It First"
 "MT-blah: Blah-blah Tele-blah"
 "I love my MTV"
 "Don't let Jerry Win. Best watch your MTV's"
 "Think MTV"
 "Not on TV, on M-TV"
 "On MTV and Nowhere Else"
 "Just See MTV"
 "MTV Enjoy"
 "MTV keeps you plugged in"
 "You Down Wit MTV?!"
 "MTV: We Don't Play Music"
 "MTV is no longer: It's MetallicaTeleVision" (Lars Ulrich in 1996)

MTV slogans on international channels
 "The Number One Music Channel" (slogan used for MTV UK from 2000 to 2002. As the channel broadcasts on digital cable and satellite, the slogan was discontinued in 2003. The decline in music related programming on MTV may have also played a part as to why this slogan was dropped.)
 "Nongkrong di MTV" (Slogan in MTV Asia for MTV Indonesia before MTV Indonesia aired (1997-2001)
 "MTV Gue Banget" (MTV Indonesia aired on Global TV (Indonesia), 2002–2007)
 "MTV Ayos" (MTV Philippines)
 "Habla Tu MTV"
 "Musical Tele-vis-i-on" (MTV UK - The 'Music Man')
 "There's Something in the Water!" (MTV Canada)
 "Don't Give Up Your M" (MTV Australia, MTV New Zealand and MTV Baltics)
 "MTV will make New Zealand music history" (MTV New Zealand)
 "Follow The Music, Follow MTV" (first introduced on MTV Italia in May 2001, later shown also on MTV France and MTV Portugal)
 "I Like..." (MTV Asia)
 "Because MTV brings out the bitch in you" (MTV New Zealand)
 "MTV May Contain Nuts" (MTV New Zealand)
 "MTV - we know where you live" (MTV Australia)
 "MTV - we want you to have our baby" (MTV Australia)

Paramount Media Networks